Karnataka State Film Award for Best Music Director is a state film award of the Indian state of Karnataka  given during the annual Karnataka State Film Awards. The award honours Kannada language films.

Superlative winners

Winners
The following is a partial list of award winners and the name of the films for which they won.

Key

See also
 Cinema of Karnataka
 List of Kannada-language films

Notes

References

Karnataka State Film Awards
1967 establishments in Mysore State